Dendropsophus minimus is a species of frog in the family Hylidae.
It is endemic to Brazil.
Its natural habitats are subtropical or tropical moist lowland forests, rivers, freshwater marshes, and intermittent freshwater marshes.

References

minimus
Endemic fauna of Brazil
Amphibians described in 1933
Taxonomy articles created by Polbot